(The Book of the Generations/History/Life of Jesus), often abbreviated as Toledot Yeshu, is an early Jewish text taken to be an alternative biography of Jesus of Nazareth. It exists in a number of different versions, none of which is considered either canonical or normative within Rabbinic literature, but which appear to have been widely circulated in Europe and the Middle East in the medieval period. A 15th-century Yemenite version of the text was titled , or the "Episode of Jesus", in which Jesus is described either as being the son of Joseph or the son of Pandera. The account portrays Jesus as an impostor.

Interestingly, the author also shows a paradoxical respect for Jesus. As Joseph Dan notes in the Encyclopedia Judaica, "The narrative in all versions treats Jesus as an exceptional person who, from his youth, demonstrated unusual wit and wisdom, but disrespect toward his elders and the sages of his age." Robert Van Voorst calls the  a record of popular polemic "run wild." The 's profane portrayal of the person Christians consider divine has provided fodder for Christian antisemitism and anti-Judaism.

The opinion of noted advocate of Christian-Jewish reconciliation, Father Edward H. Flannery, is representative:

This disregard has recently shifted towards a growing level of discussion on the text's possible scholarly use as a window into the early history of Jewish-Christian relations.

Composition and dating
As Flannery states:

The first textual evidence consists of fragments of Aramaic manuscripts discovered in Cairo. A recent study reports that more than 100 manuscripts of the  exist, almost all of them late medieval (the oldest manuscript being from the 11th century). The earliest stratum of composition was probably in Aramaic. There are recensions extant in Hebrew, and later versions in Judeo-Persian and Arabic, as well as in Yiddish and Ladino (Judeo-Spanish).

The date of composition cannot be ascertained with certainty and there are conflicting views as to what markers denote dates. This does not account for all of the manuscripts and those that were created earlier do not mention the festivals. In his Incredible Shrinking Son of Man, Robert M. Price states that the Toledot Yeshu is "dependent on second-century Jewish-Christian gospel", and Alexander argues that the oral traditions behind the written versions of the  might go all the way back to the formation of the canonical narratives themselves.

It is unlikely that one person is the author, since the narrative itself has a number of different versions, which differ in terms of the story details and the attitude towards the central characters. Even individual versions seem to come from a number of storytellers.

Some scholars assert that the source material is no earlier than the 6th century, and the compilation no earlier than the 9th century. Although individual anecdotes that make up the  may all come from sources dating before the sixth century, there is no evidence that their gathering into a single narrative is that early. Some scholars, like Jeffrey Rubenstein, favour a later composition date, after the 7th century.

The earliest known mention is an oblique mention by Agobard, archbishop of Lyon, and then another mention by his successor, Amulo, .

The source material for the  can be said to derive from four sources:

 Jewish rabbinic literature
 canonical Christian scriptures;
 noncanonical Christian writings;
 pagan anti-Christian writings of the Roman period.

The largest source of input to the  seems to be anecdotes gathered from various parts of the Talmud and Midrash. These appear to be popular adaptations of material aimed against two Christian doctrines: the virgin birth and the ascension. Some of the Talmudic anecdotes are clearly fictitious or absurd, and some seem incompatible with each other or with known historical fact.

Significantly, the  seems to know (although sometimes only superficially) of the miracles of the canonical Gospels, and does not deny their occurrence, but instead attributes them to Yeshu's use of Egyptian magic, or his appropriation of the Ineffable Name (the Divine Name), but not to diabolical incantations.

Some of the anecdotes recounted in the  seem to have been drawn from non-canonical early Christian writings known as apocryphal gospels, datable to the 4th–6th centuries AD.

The attribution of Yeshu's paternity to a soldier named Pandera or Pantera can be traced to the second-century Greek philosopher Celsus, although Celsus himself was citing a Jewish contemporary in his account. Jews apparently polemicised actively against the new Christian religion, as can be inferred from the 2nd century Christian writer Justin Martyr's Dialogue with Trypho, a fictional dialogue between a Christian and a Jew. In chapter 17 Justin claims that the Jews had sent out "chosen men" throughout the Roman Empire to polemicize against Christianity, calling it a "godless heresy".

One early version of the  gave a milder description of Christianity. It did not cast aspersions on the characters of Mary and Jesus, instead it sought to undermine the tenets of the Christian faith. The goal was to seek the return of apostates to the Jewish fold. In keeping with this, Paola Tartakoff believes that the Toledot may have been modified by Jews to fit into specific situations.

Christian response

From the 9th through the 20th centuries, the  has inflamed Christian hostility towards Jews.

A book under this title was strongly condemned by Francesc Eiximenis ( 1409) in his , but in 1614 it was largely reprinted by a Jewish convert to Christianity, Samuel Friedrich Brenz, in Nuremberg, as part of his book vilifying his former religion, titled Skin Shed by the Jewish Snake.

Martin Luther quoted the Toledot (evidently the Strassburg version) at length in his general condemnation of Jews in his book  in 1543.

In the two centuries after Luther, the  reached the height of its fame and was well sought after by scholars and travelers alike. In 1681 Professor Johann Christoph Wagenseil published an entire volume devoted to refuting the Toledot. Attitudes towards the work became more diversified during the Age of Enlightenment.

Historiography

Ramón Martí version, 13th century

Strassburg Manuscript

In the Strassburg Manuscript, Mary was seduced by a soldier called Ben Pandera. The child Jesus shows great impudence by appearing bareheaded and disputing the Law with teachers.

The miracle working powers of Jesus are attributed to having stolen the Name of God from the Temple. Jesus claims messianic dignity and is accused of sorcery by the Jews in front of Queen Helena of Jerusalem, but Jesus raises a man from the dead in front of the Queen's eyes and is released. Jesus goes to Galilee where he brings clay birds to life and makes a millstone float. (Klausner notes that the  scarcely ever denies Gospel miracles, but merely changes good to evil.)

Judas Iscariot, the hero of the tale, learns the Divine Name as well, and Jesus and Judas fly through the sky engaged in aerial combat, with Judas victorious. The now powerless Jesus is arrested and put to death by being hung upon a carob tree, and buried.

The body is taken away and his ascension is claimed by his apostles on the basis of the empty tomb. However, Jesus's body is found hidden in a garden and is dragged back to Jerusalem and shown to Queen Helena.

Wagenseil version, 1681

The first section treats Jesus's life; later sections deal with the exploits of his apostles.  Supplementary chapters tell of Nestorius and his attempts to keep Christians obeying Jewish custom, and the story of Simeon Kepha who is construed to be the Apostle Peter or Paul.

Jesus is portrayed as a deceiver and a heretic, showing a connection to the traditions in Celsus and Justin Martyr (see above).

Summary of Wagenseil version

A great misfortune struck Israel in the year 3651. A man of the tribe of Judah, Joseph Pandera, lived near a widow who had a daughter called Miriam. This virgin was betrothed to Yohanan, a Torah-learned and God-fearing man of the house of David. Before the end of a certain Sabbath, Joseph looked lustfully at Miriam, knocked on her door and pretended to be her husband, but she only submitted against her will. When Yohanan came later to see her, she was surprised how strange his behavior was. Thus they both knew of Pandera's crime and Miriam's fault. Without witnesses to punish Pandera, Yohanan left for Babylonia.

Miriam gave birth to Yeshua, whose name later depreciated to Yeshu. When he was old enough, she took him to study the Jewish tradition. One day he walked with his head uncovered, showing disrespect, in front of the sages. This betrayed his illegitimacy and Miriam admitted him as Pandera's son. Scandalised, he fled to Upper Galilee.

Yeshu later went to the Jerusalem Temple and learned the letters of God's ineffable name (one could do anything desired by them). He gathered 310 young men and proclaimed himself the Messiah, claiming Isaiah's "a virgin shall conceive and bear a son" and other prophets prophesied about him. Using God's name he healed a lame man, they worshipped him as the Messiah. The Sanhedrin decided to arrest him, and sent messengers to invite him to Jerusalem. They pretended to be his disciples to trick him.

When he was brought, bound, before Queen Helen, the sages accused him of sorcery. When he brought a corpse to life, she released him.

Accused again, the queen sent for his arrest. He asked his disciples not to resist. Using God's name he made birds of clay and caused them to fly. The sages then got Judah Iskarioto to learn the name. At a contest of miracles between the two, they both lost knowledge of the name.

Yeshu was arrested and beaten with pomegranate staves. He was taken to Tiberias and bound to a synagogue pillar. Vinegar was given to him to drink and a crown of thorns was put on his head. An argument broke out between the elders and Yeshu followers resulting in their escape to Antioch (or Egypt). On the day before the Passover, Yeshu decided to go to the Temple and recover the secret name. He entered Jerusalem riding on an ass, but one of his followers, Judah Iskarioto, told the sages he was in the Temple. On a day before the Passover, they tried to hang him on a tree; using the name, he caused it (and any tree they should use) to break. A cabbage stalk, not being a tree, was used successfully to hang him on, and he was buried.

His followers on Sunday told the queen that he was not in his grave, that he ascended to heaven as he had prophesied. As a gardener took him from the grave, they searched it and could not find him. But the gardener confessed he had taken it to prevent his followers from stealing his body and claiming his ascension to heaven. Recovering the body, the sages tied it to a horse's tail and took it to the queen. Convinced he was a false prophet, she ridiculed his followers and commended the sages.

Huldreich version, 1705

This was based on a Hebrew manuscript, now lost, and has its own unique variants. A summary of it is  presented by Rev. Sabine Baring-Gould, The Lost and Hostile Gospels (1874, London) pages 102–115, who surmised (because of some of the errors and anecdotes) that it was of medieval German origin, perhaps not even predating Martin Luther (page 115). Baring-Gould noted (pages 69–71) that the Wagenseil version contains historical references that place its 'Yeshu' at least a century  the Jesus and Pontius Pilate of the New Testament, and the Huldrich version contains references that place its 'Yeshu' at least a full century  the time of the Gospels.

Krauss compilation, 1902

Samuel Krauss reprinted a version recounting that Miriam had been betrothed to a nobleman by the name of Yochanan, who was both a descendant of the House of David, and a God-fearing Torah scholar. In Yochanan's absence her neighbor, Yosef ben Pandera forced himself upon her, coercing her into an act of sexual intercourse during her Niddah (i.e., menstruation, a period of ritual impurity during which relations are forbidden according to Jewish Law). The fruit of the affair was a son she named Yeshu, "the bastard son of a menstruate woman."

 

English versions

The first translation into English seems to date from 1874, when Sabine Baring-Gould published The Lost and Hostile Gospels, which included lengthy summaries of two versions of the  – one called the Wagenseil and one called the Huldreich (so named from the editor of a 1705 Latin edition) – as well as quotations and descriptions of apocryphal and lost gospels of early Christian history.

Baring-Gould (page 71) notes that, although the Wagenseil version named the Queen as Helene, she is also expressly described as the widow of Alexander Jannaeus, who died BC 76, and whose widow was named Salome Alexandra and she died in BC 67.

 

Parallels
Other Jewish polemic or apologetic sources:
 Jesus in the Talmud
  or The Book of Nestor the Priest 
  of Jacob Ben Reuben, 12th century
  or Nizzahon vetus, 13th century
  of R. Joseph hen R. Nathan l'official, 13th century (Paris MS)
 The Touchstone of Ibn Shaprut
 Hasdai Crescas
 Leon of Modena

The works bear striking resemblance to Christian legends regarding Simon Magus, and to 12th-century Christian portrayals of Muhammad.

Mentions in modern literature
The book is mentioned in the poem The Ring and the Book by Robert Browning.

It is also mentioned in Mitchell James Kaplan's historical novel, "By Fire By Water."

See also
 Apocalypse of Zerubbabel
 Celsus, 2nd century philosopher, author of The True Word
 Marcello Craveri, historian and author of the similarly titled The Life of Jesus
 Gospel of Barnabas
 Historical Jesus
 Historicity of Jesus
 Historicity of the Gospels
 Jesus in the Talmud
 Jewish humor
 Paul of Tarsus and Judaism
 Tiberius Julius Abdes Pantera

Notes

References

Further reading
 ספר תולדות ישו. The Gospel according to the Jews, called Toldoth Jesu ... Now first translated from the Hebrew, R. Carlile, London, 1823
 Sefer Toledot Yeshu: sive Liber de ortu et origine Jesu ex editione wagenseiliana transcriptus et explicatus (Sefer Toledot Yeshu: or The Book of the rising and origin of Jesus from the Wagenseiliana edition: Transcription and Explanation)
 Toledoth Yeshu, English translation
 Sabine Baring-Gould, The Lost and Hostile Gospels (1874, London), a study of the Toledot with summaries of both the Wagenseil and Huldreich versions.
 Samuel Krauss, Das Leben Jesu nach juedischen Quellen (1902, Berlin; reprinted by Hildesheim, 1977 & 1994), the most thorough study, of nine versions of the Toledoth (in Hebrew and German).
 G.R.S. Mead, Jesus live 100 B.C.?
 G.W. Foote & J.M. Wheeler,  The Jewish Life of Christ being the Sepher Toldoth Jeshu (1885, London), an English translation of the Toledot, of unknown provenance, with an introduction and notes of Freethinker inclination - "We venture to think that the Christian legend of Jesus may have originated with the Jewish story of Jeshu."  This 1885 booklet was retyped (badly, with many proper names uncapitalized) and reprinted, with an introduction by Madalyn Murray O'Hair, by the American Atheist Press, Austin, Texas, in 1982.
 Peter Schäfer, Michael Meerson, Yaacov Deutsch (eds.): Toledot Yeshu ("The Life Story of Jesus") Revisited: A Princeton Conference. Mohr Siebeck, Tübingen (Germany) 2011. . [Table of Contents: http://scans.hebis.de/HEBCGI/show.pl?27602087_toc.pdf]
 Meerson, Michael, and Peter Schäfer. Toledot Yeshu : The life story of Jesus.  Texts and Studies in Ancient Judaism; 159.  Tubinger: Mohr Siebeck, 2014.   Contents:  Vol.1, Introduction and translation;   Vol.2, Critical edition; Supplementary material, Database of all Tolodot Yeshu manuscripts: www.toledot-yeshu.net

External links 

 Toledot Yeshu
 The account of the son of Joseph Pandera and how he abused the Beit Hamikdash to become a ‘powerful’ magician

Anti-Christian sentiment
Books about Jesus
Christianity and Judaism related controversies
Jesus in Judaism
Jewish apologetics
Jewish medieval literature
Obscenity controversies in literature
Virgin birth of Jesus